Thalassotalea  is an aerobic and chemo-organo-heterotrophic genus of bacteria from the family Colwelliaceae which occur in the ocean and in sea ice.''

References

Further reading 
 
 
 

 

Alteromonadales
Bacteria genera